Andy Paiko (born September 10, 1977, Woodland, California, United States) is an American glass sculptor.  He co-founded Central Coast Glass Artist Studio in 2002, was named Searchlight Artist 2008 by the American Craft Council, and was selected for the Smithsonian American Art Museum and Renwick Gallery's 2012 exhibition 40 under 40: Craft Futures.

Career

Paiko works without assistants and is largely self-taught. Characteristic works are antiquarian style glass bell jars containing obscure or extravagant artifacts, or sculpted glass celebrations of obsolete technologies reinterpreted, such as a functional seismograph based on a design by Leonardo da Vinci, an actual size, fully operable Spinning Wheel, and an array of 31 automated singing bowls of various sizes, created as a room-sized musical installation in collaboration with composer Ethan Rose. His work was discovered and became abruptly influential through a series of feature layouts in House & Garden, with depictions of Paiko's Absinthe fountain and other glass works amid Victorian ruin. Several of Paiko's works are visible on display in Portland City Hall during scenes of the television series Portlandia episode Mayor is Missing.

References

External links
Andrew Paiko's official website
American Craft Council 2008 Searchlight Artist press release (.doc file format)
Online version of the Richard Speer article in Glass Quarterly
Oregon Art Beat feature story
Smithsonian American Art Museum's 40 under 40 announcement
San Francisco Examiner Article
Online version of the Victoria Josslin article in Glass Quarterly
WIRED UK Interview
JRA Distinguished Artist Series October 2012- June 2013 pdf

1978 births
California Polytechnic State University alumni
20th-century American sculptors
Glassblowers
American glass artists
Living people
Pacific Northwest artists
21st-century American sculptors